Jozef Desiatnik (11 March 1944 – 3 September 2004) was a former Slovak football defender or midfielder and later coach. He played for VSS Košice from 1965 to 1972 and he finished his career in VSŽ Košice. During his seven seasons at the Czechoslovak First League he played 180 matches and scored 10 goals.

Desiatnik was capped 5 times for the Czechoslovakia national football team and made his debut against Finland on 7 October 1970.

References

External links
Jozef Desiatnik at The Football Association of the Czech Republic

1944 births
2004 deaths
Slovak footballers
Czechoslovak footballers
Czechoslovakia international footballers
FC VSS Košice players
Association football midfielders